Pinhas "Pini" Badash (born 29 August 1952) is an Israeli politician who has served as mayor of Omer local council since 1990. He was also a member of the Knesset for Tzomet between 1992 and 1998.

Early life
Born in moshav Gilat, Badash studied mechanical engineering at the Negev University, graduating in 1979. He finished a master's degree in administration in 2001.

Career
A member of the Tzomet secretariat and chairman of its finance committee, Badash became head of Omer local council in 1990. He was elected to the Knesset on the party's list in 1992. Chairman of the Israel-China Parliamentary Friendship League, he was  re-elected in 1996, but resigned his seat on 30 November 1998 after a new law was passed preventing Knesset members from simultaneously acting as mayors or council heads, and was replaced by Doron Shmueli.

Badash remains head of Omer local council, and has also served as a member of the Authority for Developing the Negev and chairman of the Local Authority Committee for Developing the Negev and the Negev Lobby. Justifying the use of Admissions Committees in the Negev, Badash has described Bedouin Arabs as "Termites", adding "on a day of reckoning and at a time of crisis they are the enemy".

References

External links
 

1952 births
Moshavniks
Ben-Gurion University of the Negev alumni
Mayors of local councils in Israel
Living people
Tzomet politicians
Members of the 13th Knesset (1992–1996)
Members of the 14th Knesset (1996–1999)